Parramatta District Cricket Club is a cricket club based in Parramatta, New South Wales, Australia. They are also known as the Parra and play in the Sydney Grade Cricket competition. Formerly Central Cumberland, the club was founded in 1843 and a foundation member of the grade competition. It claims to be the oldest living club in NSW & second oldest in Australia. Home of Richie Benaud, John Benaud, Doug Walters, Ben Duckett and the winner of 4 First Grade Premierships. Bob Simpson is a coaching advisor.

See also

References

External links
 

Sydney Grade Cricket clubs
Sport in Parramatta
Cricket clubs established in 1843
1843 establishments in Australia